Sok Sovan ( born 5 April 1992) is a former Cambodian footballer who last played as a defender for Phnom Penh Crown and the Cambodia national football team. He made his debut in 2013 in a friendly against Guam.

Honours

Club
Phnom Penh Crown
 Cambodian League: 2010, 2011
 Hun Sen Cup: 208, 2009
 2011 AFC President's Cup: Runner up
Boeung Ket Angkor
 Cambodian League: 2016;2017
 2015 Mekong Club Championship: Runner up

References 

1992 births
Living people
Cambodian footballers
Cambodia international footballers
Boeung Ket Rubber Field players
Phnom Penh Crown FC players
Sportspeople from Phnom Penh
Association football defenders